The Norwegian Chess Championship (NM i sjakk) is an annual tournament held in Norway during the month of July, in order to determine the national chess champion. The tournament is held at different venues each year as part of the Landsturnering (National tournament). Clubs may bid for this tournament, which is awarded by the Norwegian Chess Federation (Norges Sjakkforbund).

Past events and champions
This table summarizes all past championship events. The tournament was not held in 1928 and 1939 due to the Nordic Championships being held in Oslo those years, nor was there any event between 1940 and 1944, when Norway was occupied by Nazi Germany. The 2020 tournament was scheduled to be in Stjørdal but was cancelled due to the COVID-19 pandemic.

The number of participants is the number of players in the entire Landsturnering, not just the championship section. The champions are listed along with the club they represented when they won the championship. Titles decided by play-off matches due to equal scores in the main tournament are noted.

Rules for participation and other classes
The rules for participation are governed by the Norwegian Chess Federation (NSF).

The championship ("Elite") section is restricted to the top-rated players. In order to play for the most prestigious title of national chess champion, a player must meet at least one of the following criteria:
Won the Norwegian Championship in one of the three preceding years.
Finished third or better in last year's championship.
Won the national championship in the Junior section the previous year.
Finished second or better in the Master section (the second highest section, immediately below Elite) the previous year.
Made a tournament result which grants or would grant (for players who already have an IM title) a norm for the title of International Master during the previous year.
Have a sufficiently high Elo rating (as of 2011 the lower limit is 2350).
Been deemed otherwise eligible for participation by the Elite Committee of the Norwegian Chess Federation.
In general, an even number of participants is sought in the championship section to prevent byes from occurring.

However, the Landsturnering has several sections for lower-rated players, as well as sections for different age groups. In general, players must be members of the Norwegian Chess Federation, or a club affiliated with the federation, although exceptions may be made if the person is a member of another national chess federation. To be eligible for a championship title, a player must either be a Norwegian citizen or have been a resident of Norway for the past year.

The current regulations provide for the following age categories:
Senior A (over 60)
Senior B (over 60, rating under 1500)
Junior A (under 20)
Junior B (under 20, rating under 1500)
Cadet A (under 16)
Cadet B (under 16, rating under 1250)
Lilleputt (under 13)
Miniputt (under 11)
The Senior, Junior and Cadet categories are split into an "A" and "B" group by rating, but are combined if either of the groups has fewer than 10 participants. A separate section for Junior B has not been arranged in the last few tournaments, and in 2008 the number of entries for that section was zero.

The rating sections are open for players of all age groups, and are divided into the classes
Mester (Master) (rating over 2000)
1 (rating 1750–1999)
2 (rating 1500–1749)
3 (rating 1250–1499)
4 (rating 1000–1249)
5 (players not qualifying for a higher section)
A player cannot be required to play in a higher class than what the last rating list indicates; however, a player may elect to play up if a sufficiently high rating was obtained on any of the four official rating lists during the year. In addition, players may elect to play in a higher section if they scored at least 60% in that same class the previous year, if they were in the top 7% of the class below the previous year, or if they won the Norwegian Grand Prix tournament series for the rating class below in the previous year. In addition, winners of the individual circuit championships and the champion of Northern Norway are automatically qualified for play in the Master class, regardless of rating. The top two finishers of the Master class qualify for next year's championship section.

Arrangement
In the past ten years, the championship section has had approximately 20 players. If there are at least 16 players, it is arranged as a nine-round Monrad tournament, a system similar to the Swiss system tournament. The official Norwegian Chess Federation policies also allow the tournament to be arranged as a round-robin with 10 or 12 players. From 2013 the regular Swiss system will be used in the Championship section, and be an alternative to the Monrad in the other sections.

If two or more players are tied for points at the end of the tournament, the tiebreak rules depend on the system used. When the tournament is arranged as a Monrad, a modified Buchholz system is used, where the first tiebreak is the sum of a player's opponents' scores, except the two weakest. If still tied, the second weakest and then the weakest scores are added to the tiebreak points. If still tied, the Neustadtl score, that is the sum of defeated opponents' scores plus half of drawn opponents' scores, is used. In 2015, when the Swiss System was used in all sections, the tiebreaks, in order, were median Buchholz (strongest and weakest opponents discounted), Buchholz -1 (weakest opponent discounted), regular Buchholz, and finally the average rating of opponents.

Prior to 2014 the Championship, Junior, Cadet and Senior sections, a tied score resulted in a play-off for the title within 60 days after the end of the main tournament. The rules of the play-off changed several times. A rule change in 2013 abolished the play-off entirely effective from the 2014 tournament.

Notes

References

Chess national championships
Championship
Chess
Recurring sporting events established in 1918
1918 establishments in Norway